Cúa (founded in 1690) is a small city capital of the Urdaneta Municipality, located in the Miranda State (Estado Miranda) in the north of Venezuela with an altitude of 490 m. Cúa is noted for warm and clear weather, with year-round sunshine and 60 days of rainfall annually, and an average temperature that range from 18 °C to 28 °C, but with relative low humidity.

With leafy forest and meadows, Cúa has a population of 123,000 (2004), mainly dedicated to services and industry (plastic pipes, paper rolls) it's a dormitory town. The most important districts of Cúa are: Nueva Cúa, Lecumberry, La Fila, Mume, Santa rosa and Aparay.

The local Sanctuary of the Virgin of Betania has become famous for its attributed Marian apparitions.

Cúa is one of the locations served by the IFE Ezequiel Zamora Mass Transportation System.

Foundation

The first establishments of Cúa dates from the pre-Columbian period, being the first founders the Quiriquires natives, has like nickname The Tuy Pearl, because its location at the borders of the Tuy River. After the officially foundation on October 6, 1690 by Fray Manuel de Alesson, under the invocation of Our Lady of the Rosary of Cúa, the first inhabitants came from different regions motivated by the agriculture, due to the fertility and strategic location of the valley. However, this town was founded initially at the site known as Marín in 1633, this first village was destroyed in its totality by a violent earthquake that affected a great part of the Tuy Valleys.

The name of Cúa, according to some historians, has it origin from the Cumanagotos natives, from the Carib language that means Crab, meaning that Cúa is the place where the crab abounds. Others affirm that its name is associate with Apacuana, a brave native woman from the region, that fought against the Spaniards. Others think that that name was giving in honor to the native Cue, ally of the Spaniards, that helped in the foundation and consolidation of the town.

Geography

Climate

Law and government
Cúa has one municipality: Urdaneta Municipality. 
Venezuelan law specifies that municipal governments have four main functions: executive, legislative, comptroller, and planning. The executive function is managed by the mayor, who is in charge of representing the municipality's administration. The legislative branch is represented by the Municipal Council, composed of seven councillors, charged with the deliberation of new decrees and local laws. The comptroller tasks are managed by the municipal comptroller's office, which oversees accountancy. Finally, planning is represented by the Local Public Planning Council, which manages development projects for the municipality.

Demographics

Cúa has a total area of 273 km2 (105.4 mi2), with a population of 123,000 (2004), the city limits by the north with the municipalities Cristóbal Rojas (Charallave) and Guaicaipuro  (Paracotos parish), by the south with San Casimiro municipality (Aragua state), by the east with Tomás lander municipality (Santa Bárbara and Ocumare del Tuy parishes) and by the west again with Guicaipuro municipality (Tácata parish). The main routes of communication are the Charallave-Cúa highway, that communicates this cities with the rest of the Tuy Valleys and Caracas, in addition to the connection with the Regional del Centro Freeway, and the road to the Venezuelan plains, the highway to Ocumare and the highway towards Tácata.

Cúa districts

Parishes

Cúa
Nueva Cúa

Transportation

Buses are the main means of mass transportation, operated by several companies on normal streets and avenues:
 bus; large buses.
 buseta; medium size buses.
 microbus or colectivo; vans or minivans.
IFE; train services to and from Caracas and Charallave.

Main avenues
 Perimetral avenue
 Monseñor Pellín avenue
 José María Carreño street
 El Rosario street
 El Carmen street
 Lecumberry street
 San Rafael street
 Juan España street
 Zamora street

Notable people
Ezequiel Zamora
José María Carreño
Cristóbal Rojas
Baudilio Díaz
María Teresa Castillo
Victor Guillermo Ramos Rangel
Evencio Castellanos
Pancho Prin
Gregor Blanco

See also

 Miranda state
 Charallave
 List of cities in Venezuela

References

External links
 FallingRain Map - elevation = 227 (Red dots are railways as at 2000) (Estado Miranda)
  Urdaneta Municipality website

Populated places established in 1690
Cities in Miranda (state)
1690 establishments in the Spanish Empire